Gerald Archibald Hitchens (8 October 1934 – 13 April 1983) was an English footballer who played as a centre forward.

Early career
Hitchens was born in the village of Rawnsley, Staffordshire, near Cannock, and began his career as a coal miner. He played in Shropshire with Highley Youth Club and Highley Miners Welfare between 1952 and 1953. He appeared in a county cup final for the Miners at Aggborough, the home stadium of local club Kidderminster Harriers. His performance was being watched by the Harriers club secretary Ted Gamson, who went on to offer Hitchens a contract in September 1953. After several seasons in the reserves, Hitchens played fourteen games for the first team, scoring six goals.

Professional career
Despite interest from West Bromwich Albion and Aston Villa, Hitchens moved to Cardiff City in January 1955 for a fee of £1,500. Hitchens got off to a good start by scoring within three minutes of the kick-off when making his League debut against Wolverhampton Wanderers in April 1955. Hitchens was then playing inside-forward but he subsequently took over the centre-forward berth and was top scorer in the subsequent two seasons.

Hitchens moved on to Aston Villa in 1957 for £22,500, where he spent four seasons, scoring 96 goals in 160 appearances.

He made his debut for England in 1961, scoring after just 90 seconds in an 8–0 drubbing of Mexico, and two weeks later scored twice more in Rome as England beat Italy 3–2.

This brought him to the attention of Inter Milan, who signed him in the summer of 1961 for £85,000.
Hitchens was Internazionale's top scorer with 16 goals in his first season.

He played for England in the 1962 World Cup in Chile, and won a total of seven caps, scoring five goals. When chosen to appear for England in the World Cup, Hitchens became the first Englishman to represent his country while on the books of a foreign club. Inter won Serie A in 1963, making him the second Englishman to win the Italian title after Jimmy Greaves and the last until Ashley Young did so for the same club in 2021.

However, when Alf Ramsey took over as England manager, Hitchens' international spell came to a halt, Ramsey preferring to pick home-based players.

Nevertheless, Hitchens stayed in Italy for nine years, also playing for Torino, Atalanta and Cagliari.

After retiring from the professional game in 1971, he played for Worcester City and Merthyr Tydfil before moving to live in Wales, managing an ironworks in Pontypridd before moving north to Holywell, Flintshire, in 1977 to run his brother-in-law's timber supply firm near Prestatyn.

He died playing in 1983 during a charity football match for a Mold-based firm of solicitors at Castell Alun sports ground in Hope. Seconds after heading a cross over the bar, Hitchens collapsed and was taken to Wrexham General Hospital but pronounced dead on arrival. His ashes were interred in Holywell on 20 April 1983. He was 48.

Career statistics

Honours
Cardiff City
 Welsh Cup: 1955–56

Aston Villa
 Second Division: 1959–60

Inter Milan
 Serie A: 1962–63

Torino
 Coppa Italia runner-up: 1962–63, 1963–64

References

External links
 Nobok
 BBC North East Wales — Hall of Fame
 Cris Freddi, The England Football Fact Book, Guinness, 1991. .
 Douglas Lamming, "English Football Internationalists' Who's Who". (1990 Hatton Press), pages 130–131

1934 births
1983 deaths
Association football forwards
English footballers
Kidderminster Harriers F.C. players
Cardiff City F.C. players
Aston Villa F.C. players
Inter Milan players
Torino F.C. players
Atalanta B.C. players
Cagliari Calcio players
Worcester City F.C. players
Merthyr Tydfil F.C. players
Serie A players
England international footballers
England under-23 international footballers
1962 FIFA World Cup players
English expatriate footballers
Expatriate footballers in Italy
English Football League players
English Football League representative players
Chicago Mustangs (1967–68) players
United Soccer Association players
English expatriates in Italy
British coal miners
People from Cannock Chase District
English expatriate sportspeople in the United States
Expatriate soccer players in the United States
Sportspeople from Staffordshire
Sport deaths in Wales